The East Central Illinois Conference or ECIC, is a high school athletic conference in Central Illinois. 6 out of the 9 schools are private schools.

Member schools

There are 9 member schools in the Conference. Greenview High School joined the ECIC in the 2018-19 academic school year.

Former members

Sports
The following are the sports offered by the East Central Illinois Conference:

Fall Sports
Boys Soccer
Girls Volleyball
Winter Sports
Boys Basketball
Girls Basketball
Spring Sports
Baseball
Girls Soccer

IHSA State level successes
Two out of the eight schools have place in IHSA State Finals.
 Cornerstone Christian Academy- Boys Soccer: 4th place 2016-17 (1A).
 University of Illinois Laboratory High School- Boys Cross Country: 3rd place 1995-96 (A).Boys Soccer: 4th place 2015-16 (1A), 2nd place 2012-13 (1A).Girls Cross Country: 3rd place 1988-89 (A) and 1991-92 (A), 2nd place 2014-15 (1A) and 2015-16 (1A).Girls Track and Field: 3rd place 1984-85 (A) and 1989-90 (A), 2nd place 1990-91 (A).Journalism: 2nd place 2007-08 and 2011–12, State Champion 2008-09.Scholastic Bowl: 4th place 2013-14 (A), 2nd place 2016-17 (2A), State Champion 2014-15 (A).Team Chess: 3rd place 1982-83 (A), 1984-85 (A), 1992-93 (A). 2nd place 1975-76 (A), 1979-80 (A), 1988-89 (A). State Champion 1977-78 (A), 1978-79 (A), 1985-86 (A), 1990-91 (A), 1991-92 (A), 1993-94 (A), 2008-09.

Ride Willard - State Champion (pole vault) Cornerstone Christian Academy 2021

See also
 List of Illinois High School Association member conferences

References

External links
 http://www.uni.illinois.edu/ecic/member_schools.shtml

Organizations based in Illinois
Sports organizations established in 2007
Sports in the Midwestern United States
High school sports in Illinois